Piha is a coastal settlement on the western coast of the Auckland Region in New Zealand.

Piha may also refer to:

Places

 Piha, Estonia, a village in southwestern Estonia

Animals
 Lipaugus, a genus of birds
 Snowornis, a genus of birds formerly part of Lipaugus
 Spratelloides delicatulus, a species of fish

Sports
 Professional Inline Hockey Association, an inline hockey league in the United States